The discography page of Lawson, an English pop rock band, consisting of Andy Brown (lead vocals, guitar), Ryan Fletcher (bass guitar, backing vocals), Joel Peat (lead guitar, backing vocals) and Adam Pitts (drums, backing vocals). Their debut studio album, Chapman Square, was released in October 2012, peaking at number four on the UK Albums Chart. The album includes the singles "When She Was Mine", "Taking Over Me", "Standing in the Dark", "Learn to Love Again". They re-released the album in the autumn of 2013 as Chapman Square Chapter II, the album includes the singles "Brokenhearted" and "Juliet". Their second studio album, Perspective, was released in July 2016, peaking at number twenty-three on the UK Albums Chart. The album includes the singles "Roads", "Under the Sun", "Money" and "Where My Love Goes".

Studio albums

Extended plays

Singles

As lead artist

Promotional singles

Music videos

Notes

References

Discographies of British artists